The 2017 Grand Prix Cycliste de Québec is a road cycling one-day race that took place on 8 September. It was the 8th edition of the Grand Prix Cycliste de Québec and the 33rd event of the 2017 UCI World Tour. It was won by Peter Sagan in the sprint.

Results

References

Grand Prix Cycliste de Quebec
Grand Prix Cycliste de Quebec
Grand Prix Cycliste de Québec
2017 in Quebec
September 2017 sports events in Canada